Big Bend Historical Area is a national historic district located at Jefferson Township, Mercer County, Pennsylvania.  The district includes 4 contributing sites and 2 contributing structures in three areas on the Shenango River.  It is the site of the early 19th century Village of Big Bend, abandoned prior to 1940. It includes the site of the Big Bend Iron Furnace (1846), and the remains of the Shenango Division of the Erie Extension Canal towpath, loading bay, and road.  Also in the district is the site of the Shenango House Hotel (c. 1830), remains of Dam Number 2, lockkeeper's house, and canal lock.

It was added to the National Register of Historic Places in 1975.

References

National Register of Historic Places in Mercer County, Pennsylvania
Buildings and structures in Mercer County, Pennsylvania
Historic districts on the National Register of Historic Places in Pennsylvania